Gribodia is an Indomalayan genus of potter wasps. It contains the following species:

 Gribodia confluenta (Smith, 1857)
 Gribodia cupreipennis (Bingham, 1894)
 Gribodia guichardi Giordani Soika, 1974
 Gribodia javana Giordani Soika, 1974
 Gribodia punctatissima Giordani Soika, 1974

References

 Vecht, J.v.d. & J.M. Carpenter. 1990. A Catalogue of the genera of the Vespidae (Hymenoptera). Zoologische Verhandelingen 260: 3 - 62.

Biological pest control wasps
Potter wasps